Oleg Stepanenko (born 20 October 1939) is a Ukrainian hurdler. He competed in the men's 110 metres hurdles at the 1968 Summer Olympics representing the Soviet Union.

References

1939 births
Living people
Athletes (track and field) at the 1968 Summer Olympics
Soviet male hurdlers
Ukrainian male hurdlers
Olympic athletes of the Soviet Union
Place of birth missing (living people)